Xiluo is an urban township in Yunlin County, Taiwan.  Xiluo may also refer to the following places in China:

, a township in Longshan County, Xiangxi Prefecture, Hunan, China
, a town in Shouyang County, Jinzhong, Shanxi, China